is a former Japanese football player.

Playing career
Mori was born in Osaka Prefecture on April 17, 1981. He joined J1 League club Vissel Kobe from youth team in 2000. Although he played several matches as midfielder like every season, he could not play many matches. In 2005, he moved to Regional Leagues club Rosso Kumamoto. Although he could not play many matches, the club was promoted to Japan Football League from 2006. In 2007, he moved to Regional Leagues club Banditonce Kobe. However he could hardly play in the match and retired end of 2007 season.

Club statistics

References

External links

1981 births
Living people
Association football people from Osaka Prefecture
Japanese footballers
J1 League players
Japan Football League players
Vissel Kobe players
Roasso Kumamoto players
Association football midfielders